Scott Louis Livingstone (born July 15, 1965) is a former professional baseball player. He played all or parts of eight seasons in Major League Baseball, from 1991 to 1998, for the Detroit Tigers, San Diego Padres, St. Louis Cardinals and Montreal Expos.

For his career, Livingstone hit .281 with 17 home runs and 177 runs batted in. In 1992, he hit .282 in 117 games and 354 at bats with a career-high 100 hits. His career high average was 1995 in his first full season with the Padres, when he hit .337 in 99 games. In 1992, Livingstone was honored as the Tigers Rookie of the Year.

Livingstone currently lives in Southlake, Texas, where he also owns his own baseball academy for kids.

References

External links

1965 births
Albuquerque Dukes players
American expatriate baseball players in Canada
Baseball players from Dallas
Detroit Tigers players
Lakeland Tigers players
Living people
London Tigers players
Louisville Redbirds players
Major League Baseball third basemen
Montreal Expos players
Norfolk Tides players
Oklahoma RedHawks players
Pan American Games medalists in baseball
Pan American Games silver medalists for the United States
Rancho Cucamonga Quakes players
Rochester Red Wings players
San Diego Padres players
St. Louis Cardinals players
Toledo Mud Hens players
Texas A&M Aggies baseball players
All-American college baseball players
Baseball players at the 1987 Pan American Games
Medalists at the 1987 Pan American Games
Mat-Su Miners players